Seth Zechariah Rudolph (born May 7, 1991) is an American soccer player.

Career

College
Rudolph played college soccer at George Washington University between 2009 and 2012, where he ranked 7th of all time with 29 career goals.

Professional
Rudolph signed with Swedish side Sandvikens IF in the summer of 2013 after a trial with the club.

He signed with United Soccer League side Saint Louis FC on April 22, 2016.

References

External links

1991 births
Living people
American soccer players
American expatriate sportspeople in Sweden
George Washington Colonials men's soccer players
Saint Louis FC players
Association football midfielders
Soccer players from Illinois
USL Championship players
Sportspeople from Belleville, Illinois
American expatriate soccer players
Expatriate footballers in Sweden
Sandvikens IF players